Finlay Robertson (born 12 November 2002) is a Scottish professional footballer who plays as a midfielder for Dundee.

Club career
Robertson began his career at his local Sunday League team Fairmuir Boys Club before joining the youth team of his boyhood club Dundee when he was 11. Finlay continued to progress through the age groups earning his first professional contract with the club on his sixteenth birthday. He made his first team debut for Dundee in the final game of the 2018–19 Scottish Premiership season against St Mirren. New manager James McPake introduced Robertson into the first team squad for the 2019–20 season.

Robertson received consistent praise regarding his performances while being such a young age, becoming a first-team regular for the Dee and earning several Man of the Match and SPFL Team of the Week nominations. Despite his first senior season finishing early due to the COVID-19 pandemic, Finlay was named as Dundee's Isobel Sneddon Young Player of the Year. In September 2020, Finlay signed a three-year extension with Dundee, keeping him at the club until 2023. In March 2021, it was announced that Robertson would miss the rest of the season with an ankle injury sustained in training.

On 24 September 2021, Robertson joined Scottish League One side Cove Rangers on loan until January 2022. Robertson returned to Dens in January, having made 10 appearances for the Toonsers.

On 26 November 2022, Robertson scored his first senior goal for Dundee, in a 6–2 Scottish Cup win over Airdrieonians. It would take just two games later for Finlay to notch his second, in a Challenge Cup win away to Falkirk.

International career 
After an impressive start to his rookie season with Dundee, Robertson earned a call-up to the Scotland U19 squad for two matches against Japan in September 2019.

Career Statistics

References

Living people
2002 births
Dundee F.C. players
Scottish footballers
Scottish Professional Football League players
Footballers from Dundee
Association football midfielders
Scotland youth international footballers
Cove Rangers F.C. players